The 1914 Victorian Football Association season was the 38th season of the Australian rules football competition. The premiership was won by the North Melbourne Football Club, after it defeated  by 35 points in the final on 22 August.

Association membership 
In October 1913, the Hawthorn Football Club from the Metropolitan Amateur Association submitted an application to join the Association; the application was accepted in December, after the Melbourne City Football Club, having endured two winless seasons since joining the Association in 1912, disbanded. As such, the size of the Association remained constant at ten clubs.

Premiership 
The home-and-home season was played over eighteen rounds, with each club playing the others twice; then, the top four clubs contested a finals series under the amended Argus system to determine the premiers for the season.

Starting from 1914, percentage in the Association was calculated as the number of points conceded for every 100 points scored. Where level on premiership points, clubs were ranked in ascending order by percentage. Previously (and again later) percentage was calculated as the number of points scored for every 100 points conceded.

Ladder

Finals

Notable events 
 Tom Clarke (Essendon) was the leading goalkicker for the season, with 46 (including finals).

External links 
 Victorian Football Association/Victorian Football League history (1877–2008)
 List of VFA/VFL Premiers (1877–2007)

References 

Victorian Football League seasons
VFL